Liyanwela Pahalagama is a village in Sri Lanka. It is located within Central Province.

See also
Liyanwela is beautiful village cover four mountain 
List of towns in Central Province, Sri Lanka

External links

Populated places in Nuwara Eliya District